The Tampa Bay Times, called the St. Petersburg Times until 2011, is an American newspaper published in St. Petersburg, Florida, United States. It has won fourteen Pulitzer Prizes since 1964, and in 2009, won two in a single year for the first time in its history, one of which was for its PolitiFact project. It is published by the Times Publishing Company, which is owned by The Poynter Institute for Media Studies, a nonprofit journalism school directly adjacent to the University of South Florida St. Petersburg campus.

History

The newspaper traces its origins to the West Hillsborough Times, a weekly newspaper established in Dunedin, Florida on the Pinellas peninsula in 1884. At the time, neither St. Petersburg nor Pinellas County existed; the peninsula was part of Hillsborough County. The paper was published weekly in the back of a pharmacy and had a circulation of 480. It subsequently changed ownership six times in seventeen years. In December 1884 it was bought by A. C. Turner, who moved it to Clear Water Harbor (modern Clearwater, Florida). In 1892 it moved to St. Petersburg, and by 1898 it was officially renamed the St. Petersburg Times.

The Times became bi-weekly in 1907, and began publication six days a week in 1912. Paul Poynter, a publisher originally from Indiana, bought the paper in September 1912 and converted to a seven-day paper, though it was rarely financially stable. Paul's son, Nelson Poynter, became editor in 1939 and took majority control of the paper in 1947, and set about improving the paper's finances and prestige. Nelson Poynter controlled the paper until his death in 1978, when he willed the majority of the stock to the non-profit Poynter Institute. In November 1986, the Evening Independent was merged into the Times. Poynter was succeeded as editor by Eugene Patterson (1978–1988), Andrew Barnes (1988–2004), Paul Tash (2004–2010; chair of the Times Publishing Company since 2004 and the Poynter Institute since 2007) Neil Brown (2010–2017), and Mark Katches (2018–present).

On January 1, 2012, the St. Petersburg Times was renamed the Tampa Bay Times; this stemmed from a 2006 decision of a lawsuit with Media General, at the time the publishers of the Times competing newspaper, The Tampa Tribune, which allowed that paper to keep its exclusive right to use the name of its defunct sister paper, The Tampa Times, for five years after the decision.

As the newly rechristened Tampa Bay Times, the paper's weekday tabloid tbt*, a free daily publication and which used "(* Tampa Bay Times)" as its subtitle, became just tbt when the name change took place. The St. Pete Times name lives on as the name for the Times neighborhood news sections in southern Pinellas County (formerly Neighborhood Times), serving communities from Largo southward.

The Times has also done significant investigative reporting on the Church of Scientology, since the church's acquisition of the Fort Harrison Hotel in 1975 and other holdings in Clearwater. The Times has published special reports and series critical of the church and its current leader, David Miscavige.

In 2010, the Times published an investigative report questioning the validity of the United States Navy Veterans Association, leading to significant reaction and official investigations into the group nationwide.

On May 3, 2016, the Times acquired its longtime competitor The Tampa Tribune, with the latter publication immediately ceasing publishing and Tribune features and some writers expected to be merged into the Times. As reported by other local media outlets in the Tampa Bay area at the time of this acquisition, for many years the Tampa Tribune was considered to be the more conservative newspaper in the region, while the Tampa Bay Times was thought of as more liberal.

The Times purchase of The Tribune also allowed its circulation area to be expanded into Polk County, placing it in competition with other newspapers such as The Lakeland Ledger and The Polk County Democrat, as well as into the south central region of the state known as the Florida Heartland. In the case of the latter, the Times published Highlands Today, which was a daily news supplement of The Tribune for readers in Highlands County. The Times sold the paper in 2016 to Sun Coast Media Group.

The Times received $8.5 million in federal loans from the Paycheck Protection Program by July 2020 during the COVID-19 pandemic. By this point, they had reduced delivery to two days per week. They had also cut 11 journalists' jobs through layoffs expected before the pandemic.

PolitiFact.com

The newspaper created PolitiFact.com, a project in which its reporters and editors "fact-check statements by members of Congress, the White House, lobbyists and interest groups…" They publish original statements and their evaluations on the PolitiFact.com website, and assign each a "Truth-O-Meter" rating, with ratings ranging from "True" for completely true statements to "Pants on Fire" (from the taunt "Liar, liar, pants on fire") for false and ridiculous statements. The site also includes an "Obameter", tracking U.S. President Barack Obama's performance with regard to his campaign promises. PolitiFact.com was awarded the Pulitzer Prize for National Reporting in 2009 for "its fact-checking initiative during the 2008 presidential campaign that used probing reporters and the power of the World Wide Web to examine more than 750 political claims, separating rhetoric from truth to enlighten voters." The Times sold PolitiFact.com to its parent company, the Poynter Institute, in 2018.

Awards and nominations

See also

 List of newspapers in Florida
 Media in the Tampa Bay Area

Notes

Further reading

External links

 
 
 PolitiFact.com website

 
1884 establishments in Florida
Mass media in St. Petersburg, Florida
Newspapers published in Florida
Publications established in 1884
Pulitzer Prize-winning newspapers
Daily newspapers published in the United States
Pulitzer Prize for National Reporting winners